John Austin Gray MC (16 April 1892 – 6 May 1939) was an Australian politician.

He was born in Warracknabeal to storekeeper Archibald Gray and Hannah Isabella Hutchinson. He attended state schools before working for the State Savings Bank of Victoria. During the First World War he served with the 6th Light Trench Mortar Battery, being awarded the Military Cross. On his return he became an accountant. On 3 November 1920 he married Jessie Millicent Harris, with whom he had four children. He served on Hawthorn City Council from 1927 to 1939 and was mayor from 1937 to 1938. A founding member and president of the Young Nationalists, he won a by-election for the Victorian Legislative Assembly seat of Hawthorn in 1930. He was briefly a minister without portfolio from March to April 1935. Gray held his seat until his death in Hawthorn in 1939.

References

1892 births
1939 deaths
Australian Army officers
Australian military personnel of World War I
Australian recipients of the Military Cross
Members of the Victorian Legislative Assembly
Nationalist Party of Australia members of the Parliament of Victoria
United Australia Party members of the Parliament of Victoria
20th-century Australian politicians
People from Warracknabeal
Military personnel from Victoria (Australia)